Halakha (Jewish law) addresses a number of topics applicable to tobacco and cigarette smoking. These include the health impacts of smoking; the permissibility of smoking on holidays and fast days, and the impacts of second-hand smoke on other people.

Historical background
Until the late 20th century, the use of tobacco for smoking and in the form of snuff was common among Jews. It is speculated that a Jew named Luis de Torres, who accompanied Christopher Columbus on his expedition in 1492, settled in Cuba, learned the use of tobacco, and introduced it into Europe. From this time, Jews were connected with the trade in tobacco.

Ritual concerns
As early as the 17th century, rabbis debated various halachic issues that arose in connection with tobacco use, particularly its permissibility on Shabbat, holidays, fast days, and whether a blessing must be recited before use. Among the early sources are Keneset ha-Gedolah by R' Chaim Benveniste (1603–73) and Magen Avraham by Avraham Gombiner (1635–83).

Gombiner referred to the "drinking of tobak [tobacco] through a pipe by drawing the smoke into the mouth and discharging it," and was undecided on whether a smoker should first make a blessing over smoking as a type of refreshment. Believing that tobacco was soaked in beer—a kind of chametz—he banned smoking during Passover.

Benveniste expressed himself very forcibly against smoking tutun (tobacco) on Tisha BeAv, and reportedly excommunicated a Jew who smoked on that solemn fast-day. Benveniste pointed out the inconsistency of those authorities who permit smoking on holidays because it is a 'necessity,' a 'means of sustaining life,' and who allow it on fast-days because smoke has no 'substance' like food. In Benveniste's opinion, smoking was prohibited on holidays; he quoted Rabbi Joseph Escapa as coinciding in this view, though he thought it unwise to enforce a generally accepted law.

Writing in Turkey, an Islamic country, Benveniste further argued that smoking on fast days is Chillul Hashem (a defamation of God's name), because Muslims refraining from smoking on fast-days would see Jews smoking on theirs. Despite such concerns, some Jews did smoke on Shabbat using hookas prepared before Shabbat, or else visited Muslim neighbors to enjoy the smoke in their homes. Rabbinic authorities banned this practice on the grounds that Gentiles would consider Judaism as ridiculous.

The Turkish narghile, in which the smoke passes through water, early became popular; Benveniste rules that the "tumbak" (cake of tobacco, over which a burning coal is placed at the other end of the narghile) extinguishes the fire, which is forbidden on holidays as well as Shabbat. Gombiner prohibits tumbak because it is like "mugmar" (spice for burning), mentioned in the Talmud, which likewise is prohibited. This, however, is disputed by R.  who permits the use of the narghile on holidays. The controversy finally ended in a victory for those rabbis who permitted the use of tobacco on holidays and fast-days, except of course on Yom Kippur, which is like Sabbath; still, some Jews still abstain from smoking on Tisha BeAv.

Unlike smoking, the use of snuff was allowed on the Sabbath, holidays, fast-days, and Yom Kippur. Jacob Hagiz (1620-74) quotes a responsum of Isaiah Pinto permitting the use of snuff on the Sabbath, even though it cures catarrh; for everybody, even healthy people, use snuff, and it can not therefore be considered a drug.

Moral concerns
The Chofetz Chaim (1838–1933) sought to dissuade practitioners from smoking.  He considered it a waste of time, and saw the practice of people borrowing cigarettes from each other as morally questionable.

R' Moshe Feinstein prohibited smoking in any place where other people are found, on the grounds that it causes them distress (even ignoring health impacts).

The early modern responsa literature addresses the question of students smoking in their batei midrash and synagogues. Some rabbis sought to outlaw smoking and the use of snuff in places of worship and posted notices for study halls. Many leading acharonim prohibited smoking in batei midrash and synagogues on the grounds that smoking is a frivolous activity that does not show respect for the holiness of these places.

Health concerns

When 20th century medicine discovered the negative effects of smoking on health, the question arose whether smoking is forbidden in all circumstances. The debate about the acceptability of smoking according to halacha is centered primarily around the prohibition for a person to damage his body, or bring about his death.

Opponents of smoking argue that since there is a clear link between smoking and cancer, smoking should be prohibited. However, Rabbi Moses Feinstein wrote a responsum stating that while inadvisable, smoking was permitted for one who had already started. Feinstein explained that since the risk of illness or death due to smoking is considered small, and it is a widespread practice, it is therefore permitted under the rabbinical principle:  "The Lord protects the simple." However, starting to smoke would be prohibited because of the transgression of v'lo sasuru. According to students, when informed of the dangers of smoking, Rabbi Aaron Kotler ruled that smoking was a biblical transgression. Many Haredi rabbis have called on people not to smoke and called smoking an 'evil habit'. These rabbis include Rabbi Yosef Sholom Eliashiv, Rabbi Aharon Leib Shteinman, Rabbi Moshe Shmuel Shapiro, Rabbi Michel Yehuda Lefkowitz, Rabbi Nissim Karelitz, and Rabbi Shmuel Auerbach. Rabbi Shmuel HaLevi Wosner forbade people from starting to smoke and said that those who smoke are obligated to do everything they can to stop. All of these rabbis also said that it is forbidden to smoke in a public place, where others might be bothered by it.

Among important Sephardi Haredi rabbis, Rabbi Ben Tzion Abba Shaul and Rabbi Moshe Tzadka called on youth not to start smoking.

Other major Ashkenazi rabbis who explicitly forbade smoking include Rabbi Eliezer Waldenberg, Rabbi Moshe Stern, and Rabbi Chaim Pinchas Sheinberg.

Smoking is specifically prohibited by Solomon Freehof, other Reform rabbis, as well as rabbis in the Conservative movement in the U.S. and Israel. 

There is a custom still practiced today by Hasidic and some Haredi grooms who hand out free cigarettes to their friends at their vort (engagement). Recent rulings against smoking by great rabbis do not have seemed to have stopped the tradition. Early on in the Hasidic movement, the Baal Shem Tov taught that smoking tobacco can be used as a religious devotion, and can even help bring the Messianic Era.  Rabbi Levi Yitzchok of Berditchev is quoted as saying that "a Jew smokes on the weekdays and sniffs tobacco on the Sabbath". Rabbi Dovid of Lelov taught that it is a good religious practice to smoke on Saturday nights after the Sabbath, and this practice is followed by the Rebbes of Lelov and Skulen, however the current Rebbe of Skulen discourages people from following his example, in light of current views opposing smoking, and he himself only takes a few brief puffs of a cigarette after Havdalah.  Many Hasidic Jews smoke, and many who do not smoke regularly will smoke on the holiday of Purim, even if they do not do so any other time of the year, and some consider it to be a spiritual practice, similar to the smoke of the altar in the ancient Temple.  However, many Hasidic Rabbis oppose smoking.

In 2006, the Vaad Halacha (Jewish law committee), sponsored by the Rabbinical Council of America, ruled that the use of tobacco is forbidden to Jews, and the committee specifically cited and reversed precedents that permitted smoking.

References

 Its bibliography:
 Ha-Maggid, viii., No. 37; Ha-Zefirah, i., No. 8
 Keneset ha-Gedolah, iii., end
 A. K. Kaufman, Räuchert un Shikkert, Warsaw, 1900
 Löw, Lebensalter, p. 351
 Abrahams, Jewish Life in the Middle Ages, p. 139
 Steinschneider, in Die Deborah (1894), vol. xl., No. 1.
 Bleich, J. D. "Smoking." Tradition 16, no. 4 (1977).
———. [Letter to the editor] Tradition 17 no. 3 (1978).
———. "Survey of Recent Halakhic Literature: Smoking." Tradition 23, no. 2 (1983).
 Etinger, Dov. Sefer Pe'er Tahat Efer: Ha-`Ishun Bi-Yeme Hol Uve-Yamim Tovim Le-or Ha-Halakhah. Yerushalayim: D. Etinger, 1988. Includes opinions by several important Orthodox rabbinic decisors.
 Feinstein, Moses. Sefer Igrot Moshe.
 RCA Roundtable. (Statement by progressive Orthodox Rabbis Saul Berman, Reuven Bulka, Daniel Landes and Jeffrey Woolf.) “Proposal on smoking” (unpublished) July 1991. 
 Rosner, Fred. “Cigarette Smoking in Jewish Law” Journal of Halacha and Contemporary Society 4 (1982): 33-45
———. Modern Medicine and Jewish Ethics. Hoboken, N.J. New York: Ktav Pub. House; Yeshiva University Press, 1986.
 Stone, Daniel. “Smoking in Halakhah” [Hebrew] Beit Yitzkhak 20 (1988)
 Waldenberg, Eliezer. Tzitz Eliezer. See: Schussheim, Eli and Eliezer Waldenberg. “Should Jewish law forbid smoking?” B’Or ha’Torah 8 (1993)

Jewish medical ethics
Jewish law
Smoking
Tobacco and religion